Peursum is a former village and municipality in the Dutch province of South Holland. The website was located on the north bank of the small river Giessen.

Peursum was a separate municipality between 1817 and 1956, when it became part of Giessenburg. In 1857 Peursum was enlarged with the former municipality of Nederslingeland.

References

Former municipalities of South Holland
Molenlanden